Keeping Faith ("One Wednesday Morning") is a British thriller television series, filmed and set in Wales, and first broadcast in Welsh on S4C from 5 November 2017.

Created by Matthew Hall and produced by Vox Pictures. The series stars Eve Myles as Faith Howells, a solicitor at a family-run law firm whose husband, Evan, disappears whilst she is on maternity leave following the birth of their third child.

Renamed Keeping Faith, the English version premiered on BBC One Wales on 13 February 2018. The first series co-stars Hannah Daniel, Matthew Gravelle, Bradley Freegard, Mark Lewis Jones, Mali Harries and Aneirin Hughes. The show was extremely popular in Wales, with an average of 300,000 viewers per episode, making it the most popular show on BBC Wales for over 25 years and, with over 8.5 million downloads by May 2018, the most downloaded non-network show on BBC iPlayer.

Filmed concurrently in both languages, this series is the second in a season of bilingual dramas set to premiere back-to-back on S4C. The initial Welsh language broadcast on S4C carried entirely English subtitles, while repeat airings carried encoded English subtitles. The series has been available on the BBC iPlayer as part of the BBC's ongoing relationship with S4C.

On 15 June 2018, the BBC announced that Keeping Faith would be shown across the UK on BBC One, beginning on 10 July 2018. The Head of Commissioning for BBC Wales, Nick Andrews, said that the series had been "a real gem from start to finish", and a testament to the strength of drama coming out of Wales.

With series one ending with a cliff-hanger, Huw Thomas, the BBC Wales arts and media correspondent, wrote on 6 May 2018 that a second series is in development, and later that year, the second series was commissioned. Production began in September 2018 and broadcast in Wales, first in Welsh (with English subtitles) on S4C, from 12 May 2019; nationally shown on BBC One in English during July–August 2019.

The third and final series premiered on S4C (as Un Bore Mercher) in 2020 during November and December, and the English language broadcast began on BBC One on 27 March 2021. This series was made available on the BBC iPlayer on 27 March 2021. By May 2021 the series had had over 50 million views on BBC iPlayer.

Cast

 Eve Myles as Faith Howells; solicitor and mother of three. Evan Howells' wife
 Bradley Freegard as Evan Howells; struck off solicitor. Faith's husband
 Demi Letherby as Alys Howells; elder daughter of Faith and Evan
 Lacey Jones as Megan Howells; younger daughter of Faith and Evan
 Oscar & Harry Unsworth as Rhodri Howells; son of Faith and Evan
 Aneirin Hughes as Tom Howells; Evan's father and solicitor
 Hannah Daniel as Cerys Jones; solicitor at Howells
 Betsan Llwyd (Un Bore Mercher) / Suzanne Packer (Keeping Faith) as Delyth Lloyd; Howells office administrator
 Eiry Thomas as DI (Series 1), PC (Series 2), DS (Series  3) Susan Williams; Abercorran police
 Steffan Rhodri as Judge Gwyn Daniels
 Matthew Gravelle as PC Terry Price; Abercorran police (Series 1)
 Mali Harries as Bethan Price; Terry's wife and Evan's sister (Series 1)
 Rhian Morgan as Marion Howells; Evan's mother
 Mark Lewis Jones as Steve Baldini; client
 Martha Bright as Angie Baldini; Steve's daughter
 Alex Harries as Arthur Davies; client
 Catherine Ayers as Lisa Connors; Faith's best friend
 Angeline Ball (Series 1) / Anastasia Hille (Series 2) as Gael Reardon; widow of Paddy Reardon
 Richard Elfyn as DCI Huw Parry of Swansea police (Series 1)
 Lowri Palfrey as Erin Glynn; client (Series 1)
 Aimee-Ffion Edwards as Madlen Vaughan; client (Series 2)
 Brochan Evans as Dyfan Vaughan; Madlen's son (Series 2)
 Rhashan Stone as DI Laurence Breeze; CID detective (Series 2 and 3)
 Rhian Blythe as Anya Flye; Howells' bank manager (Series 2)
 Richard Lynch as Hayden Swancott QC (Series 2)
 Francesca Dimech as Mrs. Kriprinski (Series 2)
 Siân Phillips as Judge Alwen Owens (Series 3)
 Celia Imrie as Rose Fairchild; Faith's mother  (Series 3)
 Matthew Aubrey as Mike Taylor (Series 3)
 Keogh Kiernan as Osian Taylor (Series 3)
 Sion Daniel Young as Gareth; Osian's nurse (Series 3)
 Marc Antolin as Professor Rhys (Series 3)
 Rachel Cheung as the gym manager (Series 3)

Episodes

Series 1 (2017)

Series 2 (2019)

Series 3 (2021)

Production
Set in the fictional town of Abercorran, filming started in the summer of 2017 in Carmarthenshire, with exterior views of Faith's home situated high up overlooking the estuary and the castle of Laugharne. Many scenes were shot in Laugharne, also in Carmarthen; the main square and the historic courtroom in Carmarthen Guildhall was used for scenes. Other courtroom scenes feature the former courthouse at Swansea. Studio scenes were filmed at Sony UK Technology Centre's Ffilm Factory 35 in Pencoed. The Vale of Glamorgan, Pontardawe and Swansea were other filming locations.

Vox pictures produced the drama with the aid of Nevision, Cinematic Productions, Soundworks and About Premium Content. The production of the programme was funded through the Welsh Government's Media Investment Budget, which is advised by Pinewood Pictures, S4C and BBC Wales. Location assistance was provided by Wales Screen, part of the Welsh Government's creative industries team, helping to maximise the economic benefits for Wales.

Gwawr Martha Lloyd, S4C Drama Content Commissioner, said of the series; "We're very excited about this new and original series that will be premiering on S4C this autumn. With a stellar cast and a completely compelling story, plot and setting, we're hoping the audience will grow to love the world and the characters of Un Bore Mercher as much as we in S4C have as we worked to develop the series. The series intends to take the viewer on a thrilling, emotional and warm journey, which will pull at their heart-strings but will also make them smile along the way."

Critical reception
The series has generally received favourable responses and was described in The Guardian as, "a bit like Big Little Lies relocated to rural Wales". As Un Bore Mercher, the Welsh version of the series gained strong reviews. Gary Raymond, in Wales Arts Review, wrote: "...particularly interesting to see a genuine diamond emerge from the coalface in the form of Keeping Faith" and "Social media opinion has been a little more approving" [than the limited publicity surrounding the series].

Lydia Morris at the UK Daily Post wrote that the programme "...has already proved a hit with TV audiences". A review (under 'Show and Tell' by Paul Flynn) in Grazia magazine was titled "Like Broadchurch when it was good, Welsh production Keeping Faith is a TV trailblazer" and was generous with its praise. Writing in The Times, Nicole Wynne described it as "...the dual-language drama that has got box-set Britain gripped". On 2 May 2018, Stuart Heritage of the i warned, "Watch this game-changing thriller while you still can". Jon Coates in the Daily Express wrote, "Keeping Faith's unprecedented success ... has led to a primetime run on BBC One starting on Thursday ... with a second series due to begin filming this autumn." The Guardian review in July 2018, "... already a huge iPlayer hit, this Carmarthen-set drama about a vanished husband is realistic and beautifully shot ... it looks real and brilliant and Welsh". 'crimefictionlover' wrote: "The BBC has a secret... it's worth seeking out".

The first series won three Welsh BAFTAs in 2018: Best Actress (Eve Myles), Best Writer (Matthew Hall) and Original Music (Amy Wadge and Laurence Love Greed).

Music
Six original songs were composed by the singer-songwriter Amy Wadge. The English and Welsh soundtracks were released as EPs on iTunes on Friday 9 March 2018. The English versions are sung by Amy Wadge and the Welsh versions by Ela Hughes. The score music was written by Laurence Love Greed.

Notes

References

External links

2017 British television series debuts
2020 British television series endings
2010s British crime drama television series
2010s Welsh television series
Welsh-language television shows
English-language television shows
Un Bore Mercher
Television series about missing people
Television shows set in Wales
2020s British crime drama television series
2020s Welsh television series
Television shows filmed in Wales
Television series about single parent families